The 2009–10 season was Blackpool F.C.'s 102nd season (99th consecutive) in the Football League. It was also their third consecutive season in The Championship, the second tier of English football. The club won promotion, via the play-offs, to the Premier League for the first time, their 28th overall season in the top tier. Their victory over Cardiff City in the Final was the club's ninth victory in their last eleven games. It was Ian Holloway's first season as manager.

Charlie Adam, in his first season with Blackpool, finished as the club's top scorer, with nineteen goals in all competitions.

Season summary
Ian Holloway returned to his former club QPR for the opening game of the League season. Ben Burgess put the Tangerines ahead late into the first half, and that's how the score remained until Peter Ramage's 87th-minute leveller.

Three days later, Blackpool began their League Cup campaign at Crewe Alexandra. Adam Nowland, who had returned to the club on a non-contract basis the previous day, broke the deadlock on 52 minutes. Calvin Zola equalised for the Railwaymen in the 74th minute, before Daniel Nardiello, eleven minutes from time, scored what proved to be the winner.

On 15 August, Blackpool hosted Cardiff City at Bloomfield Road. Michael Chopra opened the scoring for the visitors, but Seasiders captain Ian Evatt equalised in first-half injury time. The match finished 1–1.

Derby County visited the seaside three days later, and they returned to the East Midlands with a point after a goalless draw.

On 22 August, Blackpool visited the Home Counties for a meeting with Watford. They came from behind twice to record their fourth-successive draw, Alex Baptiste and Gary Taylor-Fletcher the scorers.

In the second round of the League Cup, on 26 August, Blackpool hosted Premier League outfit Wigan Athletic. Ishmel Demontagnac scored his first goal for the club, followed by strikes by Ben Burgess (19 minutes), Charlie Adam (netting his first goal as a permanent Blackpool player), and Gary Taylor-Fletcher. The Latics pulled one back in injury time to make the final score 4–1.

Blackpool's first League victory occurred three days later, when Coventry City visited Bloomfield Road. The hosts won 3–0, extending their unbeaten start to the season to seven games.

The Tangerines suffered their first defeat of the campaign two weeks later, after an international break, at Leicester City. Matty Fryatt's double – one either side of Charlie Adam's strike just after the half-hour mark – gave the Foxes all three points.

Newcastle United travelled to Bloomfield Road on 17 September. The Magpies' Andy Carroll opened the scoring five minutes from the break, only for Brett Ormerod to level matters in first-half injury time. Jason Euell put Blackpool in front, with his first goal for the club, on 65 minutes, and it proved to be the final goal of the game.

Three days later, Ian Holloway's men visited the City Ground to face Nottingham Forest. Charlie Adam scored the only goal of the game, nineteen minutes in.

League Cup action resumed on 22 September, with a visit to Premier League side Stoke City. Blackpool were two goals up courtesy of David Vaughan and Billy Clarke, but the Potters fought back to level matters by the 79th minute. Tony Pulis' men took the lead for the first time on 80 minutes, before Ben Burgess equalised a minute later. Andy Griffin scored what proved to be the winner in injury time.

Back in the League, on 26 September the Tangerines welcomed Peterborough United to town. Jason Euell opened the scoring after three minutes. Eight minutes later, Hameur Bouazza opened his account for the club with the second, sealing 'Pool's third consecutive League victory.

Blackpool travelled to Bristol City three days later, and they suffered their second defeat of the campaign with a 0–2 scoreline.

Another, heavy defeat followed, at Crystal Palace on 3 October. 1–4 was the result at Selhurst Park.

After a fortnight's break, the Tangerines beat Plymouth Argyle 2–0 at Bloomfield Road, with Marcel Seip and David Vaughan finding the net.

Sheffield United visited the seaside on 20 October, and they returned to Yorkshire pointless after strikes from Marcel Seip, Jason Euell and Charlie Adam gave Blackpool a 3–0 victory. The result kept Blackpool in the play-off places and preserved their unbeaten home record.

The next game saw Blackpool earn a point away to Swansea in a 0–0 draw, a point that would ultimately determine the fate of both teams come the end of the season. Seven goals in the next two games saw Blackpool earn a 3–3 draw at Doncaster Rovers and a 4–1 home victory over Scunthorpe United. There then followed a slump with the Tangerines earning only one point from the next three games: a defeat away to Reading, a home draw with local rivals Preston North End, and then the first home defeat of the season, against Barnsley. A win (3–0 at Middlesbrough), a defeat at Ipswich, and a win at Derby County earned a further six points in the last three games of 2009.
 
January began with the club's only game in this season's FA Cup, a home defeat to Ipswich Town. The League resumed with two draws: 1–1 at Cardiff City and 2–2 at home to QPR, before a rescheduled visit from Sheffield Wednesday resulted in a second home defeat. A 3–2 home win against Watford and a draw at Coventry City was then followed by three straight defeats: against West Brom, Leicester City and Sheffield Wednesday. Then a visit to Deepdale could not separate the local rivals, with Preston and Blackpool playing out a goalless draw. Two 2–0 home victories (against Middlesbrough and Reading) followed. Then only four points were taken from the next five games, which saw the team lose games at Barnsley, West Brom and Sheffield United. A home victory was procured over Roy Keane's Ipswich Town after the Barnsley reversal, and a draw – also at home – against Crystal Palace rounded out the sequence.

A 5–1 victory over Swansea City on 23 March was followed four days later by a 2–0 victory in what was a long road trip to Ian Holloway's former employers, Plymouth Argyle.

Another victory ensued, this time 4–2 at Scunthorpe United. A fourth-consecutive win was achieved at home to Doncaster Rovers.

The run was ended on 10 April with a 4–1 defeat at eventual champions Newcastle United.

Blackpool completed a League double over Nottingham Forest on 17 April, with a 3–1 victory at Bloomfield Road.

Seven days later, the Seasiders made it six victories in seven games with a single-goal result at Peterborough United.

On 2 May, in the last game of the regular season, Blackpool faced Bristol City at home. Blackpool were on 69 points in the final play-off position, just one point ahead of Swansea City. Blackpool went behind in the sixteenth minute, but Brett Ormerod tied the game in the second half. The game ended 1–1. Swansea just needed to secure three points at home in their final game against Doncaster Rovers to take the final play-off place, but they were held to a goalless draw by the visitors and Blackpool made the play-offs.

In the first leg of the semi-finals, which took place on 8 May, Blackpool hosted Nottingham Forest at Bloomfield Road. The Seasiders won 2–1. Three days later, they met at the City Ground in the second leg. Forest took the lead after seven minutes, but Blackpool equalised eleven minutes into the second half. The hosts regained the lead on 66 minutes, but the visitors drew level again six minutes later. Blackpool went ahead for the first time four minutes later, and extended their lead on 79 minutes, with D. J. Campbell completing his first career hat-trick. Forest pulled one back in injury time, but Blackpool held on for a 4–3 win on the night and a 6–4 aggregate over the two legs and progressed to the final. Forest manager Billy Davies, who belittled Blackpool after the first leg, was sacked at the end of the following 2010–11 season after again failing at the play-offs stage.

The Final saw Blackpool face the victors of the other semi-final, Cardiff City, at Wembley on 22 May. The Bluebirds took the lead on nine minutes through Michael Chopra, but Charlie Adam levelled with a free-kick four minutes later. The Welsh side re-took the lead on 37 minutes, but once again their advantage lasted only four minutes, Gary Taylor-Fletcher heading in from a goal-line scramble. In first-half injury time, Brett Ormerod netted to give the Seasiders the lead for the first time, and that is how the score remained. Blackpool had won promotion to the Premier League for the first time.

The five players who were on loan to Blackpool at the end of the season – D. J. Campbell (from Leicester City), Andy Butler (Huddersfield Town), Barry Bannan (Aston Villa), Séamus Coleman (Everton) and Stephen Dobbie (Swansea City) — remained at the club until the conclusion of the civic reception that was held for the team in Blackpool on 24 May. On 26 May, Stephen McPhee, who had been out injured since January 2009, announced his retirement from the game at the age of 28. The same day, Blackpool announced that five players would not be offered new contracts when they expired. As such, they left the club on 1 July. The players in question were Al Bangura, Hameur Bouazza, Joe Martin, Danny Mitchley and Daniel Nardiello.

Championship results

Final table

Play-off results

League Cup results

FA Cup results

Player statistics

Appearances

League
Charlie Adam – 43
Al Bangura – 9
Barry Bannan – 20
Alex Baptiste – 42
Hameur Bouazza – 19
Ben Burgess – 35
DJ Campbell – 15
Billy Clarke – 18
Danny Coid – 1
Séamus Coleman – 9
Stephen Crainey – 41
Ishmel Demontagnac – 8
Stephen Dobbie – 16
Neal Eardley – 24
Ashley Eastham – 1
Rob Edwards – 21
Jay Emmanuel-Thomas – 11
Jason Euell – 33
Ian Evatt – 36
Matthew Gilks – 26
Stephen Husband – 3
Joe Martin – 6
Daniel Nardiello – 5
Brett Ormerod – 36
Paul Rachubka – 20
Marcel Seip – 7
Keith Southern – 45
Gary Taylor-Fletcher – 32
David Vaughan – 41

Players used: 29

Play-offs
Matthew Gilks – 3
Alex Baptiste – 3
Stephen Crainey – 3
Ian Evatt – 3
Séamus Coleman – 3
Keith Southern – 3
Charlie Adam – 3
David Vaughan – 3
Gary Taylor-Fletcher – 3
Ben Burgess – 3
D. J. Campbell – 3
Stephen Dobbie – 3
Brett Ormerod – 3
Barry Bannan – 2
Rob Edwards – 1

Players used: 15

FA Cup
Charlie Adam – 1
Alex Baptiste – 1
Stephen Crainey – 1
Ishmel Demontagnac – 1
Neal Eardley – 1
Rob Edwards – 1
Jason Euell – 1
Ian Evatt – 1
Joe Martin – 1
Brett Ormerod – 1
Paul Rachubka – 1
Keith Southern – 1
Gary Taylor-Fletcher – 1

Players used: 13

League Cup
Charlie Adam – 2
Louis Almond – 1
Al Bangura – 2
Alex Baptiste – 3
Hameur Bouazza – 1
Ben Burgess – 2
Billy Clarke – 3
Stephen Crainey – 1
Ishmel Demontagnac – 2
Neal Eardley – 2
Ashley Eastham – 1
Rob Edwards – 3
Jay Emmanuel-Thomas – 1
Jason Euell – 1
Ian Evatt – 1
Matthew Gilks – 3
Mark Hudson – 1
Joe Martin – 2
Daniel Nardiello – 1
Adam Nowland – 1
Brett Ormerod – 2
Keith Southern – 1
Gary Taylor-Fletcher – 2
David Vaughan – 1

Players used: 24

Goals

League
Charlie Adam – 16
Barry Bannan – 1
Alex Baptiste – 3
Hameur Bouazza – 1
Ben Burgess – 6
D. J. Campbell – 8
Billy Clarke – 1
Seamus Coleman – 1
Stephen Dobbie – 4
Jay Emmanuel-Thomas – 1
Jason Euell – 4
Ian Evatt – 4
Brett Ormerod – 11
Marcel Seip – 2
Keith Southern – 2
Gary Taylor-Fletcher – 6
David Vaughan – 1

Total League goals scored: 72 (plus two own-goals)

Play-offs
D. J. Campbell – 3
Charlie Adam – 2
Stephen Dobbie – 1
Brett Ormerod – 1
Keith Southern – 1
Gary Taylor-Fletcher – 1

Total play-offs goals scored: 9

FA Cup
Brett Ormerod – 1
Total FA Cup goals scored: 1

League Cup
Charlie Adam – 1
Ben Burgess – 2
Billy Clarke – 1
Ishmel Demontagnac – 1
Daniel Nardiello – 1
Adam Nowland – 1
Gary Taylor-Fletcher – 1
David Vaughan – 1

Total League Cup goals scored: 9

Source

References

Blackpool
Blackpool F.C. seasons